

This is a list of the National Register of Historic Places listings in Panola County, Mississippi.

This is intended to be a complete list of the properties and districts on the National Register of Historic Places in Panola County, Mississippi, United States. Latitude and longitude coordinates are provided for many National Register properties and districts; these locations may be seen together in a map.

There are 28 properties and districts listed on the National Register in the county.

Current listings

|}

See also
 
 List of National Historic Landmarks in Mississippi
 National Register of Historic Places listings in Mississippi

References

 
Panola County